John James Murphy PP (1796 - 1883) was an Irish archdeacon.

Early life
John James Murphy was born in 1796 in Ringmahon House, Mahon, Cork, Ireland. As a youngster John inherited a love for commercial pursuits coupled with a spirit of adventure from his father, James Murphy, founder of Murphy's Brewery. While still a boy, he took service in the Hudson's Bay Company, and lived for 12 years with a tribe of Canadian Indians who gave him the title of "Black Eagle of the North".

In 1825 John returned to Britain where he moved to Liverpool and entered on a commercial pursuit with his brother.

Religion
In 1840, he abandoned business in order to make a pilgrimage to the Holy Land. On his way to Jerusalem, he visited Rome, and was introduced to the President of the English College. That was to be the turning point in his life. He gave up his intended pilgrimage, and began his theological studies.  On the 2 March 1844, he was ordained to the priesthood, having in his possession on the day of his ordination, the sum of £40,000.

Famine
In 1844 John, returned to Liverpool as Fr. Murphy, and was inducted as priest-in-charge to the newly formed parish of St. Joseph's in the Irish quarter of the city. The famine in Ireland had already caused many of the Irish to seek refuge in Liverpool, where famine fever raged among the Irish residents. With his own money Fr. Murphy purchased a Methodist Chapel in the district, which he converted into a Catholic church. For three years he ministered to the spiritual and physical needs of his fellow Irish men and women.

Return to Cork
In 1847, his uncle, Bishop Murphy, of Cork died, and was succeeded by Bishop Delany, who recalled Fr. Murphy back to Cork and appointed him as chaplain to the Presentation Sisters in Bandon, Co. Cork. That same year, at his own request, he was transferred to Goleen (Schull). Again out of his own resources he provided food for the victims of the Famine.  In 1848 he was recalled to Cork City and appointed administrator of Ss. Peter & Paul's. His first duties as administrator was the provision of a larger church to replace the inadequate Carey's Lane Church.

Founder
Fr. John Murphy contributed largely out of his own funds to build Ss. Peter and Paul's Church in 1866. In addition to this, he founded the Mercy Hospital in 1867, which had formally been the Mansion House, but was then used as the Diocesan Seminary - administered by the Vincentian Fathers.

On its being turned into a hospital, the Vincentian Order founded a new home in St. Patrick's Place, which became known as St. Finbarr's Seminary.  Fr. Murphy also built the Chapel and residence at the North Infirmary Hospital for the Sisters of Charity of St. Vincent de Paul.

Death
Murphy died oo 10/3/1883 i  St. Vincent's Presbytery, Sunday's Well Rd., Cork. He was buried at Carrigrohane Cemetery, Carrigrohane, Co. Cork.

His obituary read: His Lordship, Most Rev. Dr. Delany, Bishop of Cork, was the celebrant of the Solemn Requiem Mass; deacon was, Fr. Michael O'Flynn, C.C, Ss. Peter & Paul's; sub-deacon was, Fr. Andrew Forrest, C.C., Ss. Peter & Paul's, and master of ceremonies was, Fr. Florence McCarthy, C.C., Ss. Peter & Paul's.

Appointments in brief
 Retired ex Ss. Peter & Paul's : 10/1874
 Ss. Peter & Paul's Adm : 1848 - 1874
 Schull CC : 1848 - 1848   Chaplain,
 Presentation Convent, Bandon : 1847 - 1848
 Ministry Abroad/ Liverpool : 1844 - 1847
 Appointed Archdeacon of the Diocese in July 1974.

References

Sources
 A History of the Diocese of Cork - the Episcopate of William Delany 1847 - 1886, by Evelyn Bolster, p. 34, 144, 228 - 232.
 Famine in West Cork - The Mizen Peninsula - Land and People 1800 - 1852, by Patrick Hickey. p. 241, 243, 247, 256, 354.
 The Murphy Story: the history of Lady's Well Brewery, Cork, by Diarmuid O'Drisceoil & Donal O'Drisceoil; p. 15-16.
 Fr John Murphy - Famine priest, by A.J. O'Reilly (1962).
 The Fold (Cork Diocesan Magazine) May 1966, p. 19ff.
 The Fold, May 1966, p 19ff.

1796 births
1883 deaths
19th-century Irish Roman Catholic priests